Allister Fraser Bentley (March 18, 1854 – January 31, 1947) was a Canadian politician. He served in the Legislative Assembly of New Brunswick as member of the Liberal party representing Saint John County.

References

20th-century Canadian legislators
1854 births
1947 deaths
New Brunswick Liberal Association MLAs